A parting line,  in industrial casting of molds, is the border line in which draft angles change direction. One can check the parting line in the mould or product which divides the two half, i.e; the core and the cavity of a molded part.  It is sometimes a starting point for the mold parting surface.  In engineering drawing, a parting line is often abbreviated as PL. ASME's Y14.8 standard specifies a symbol for parting line. Engineering applications (seals, tight running molded parts) that require precision for shape control, call for removal of flashes. Many molders will repair or even replace the mold tooling so that the flash is reduced to an acceptable tolerance or eliminated altogether. Secondary operations to remove parting line flash include hand trimming, vibratory tumbling, media blasting and cryogenic deflashing.

References

Metalworking terminology
Plastics industry